Patriarch John XIII may refer to:

 John XIII of Constantinople, Ecumenical Patriarch in 1315–1320
 Ignatius John XIII, Syriac Orthodox Patriarch of Antioch in 1483–1493
 Pope John XIII of Alexandria, Pope of Alexandria & Patriarch of the See of St. Mark in 1483–1524